The 2019 All-Ireland Senior Football Championship was the 132nd edition of the GAA's premier inter-county Gaelic football tournament since its establishment in 1887.

Thirty-three teams took part – thirty-one of the thirty-two Counties of Ireland, London and New York. Kilkenny, as in previous years, did not enter.

Dublin were the defending champions. In 2018 they won a record-equalling fourth consecutive title, becoming only the fourth team to achieve this feat (the other four-in-a-row champions were Wexford in 1915–18 and Kerry in 1929–32 and 1978–81). They won the 2019 final, defeating Kerry in a replay, and became the GAA's first ever five-in-a-row All-Ireland senior champions.

Competition format

Provincial Championships format
Connacht, Leinster, Munster and Ulster each organise a provincial championship. Most teams who lose a match in their provincial championship enter the All-Ireland qualifiers – New York does not enter the qualifiers.

All provincial matches are knock-out. If the score is level at the end of the normal seventy minutes, two periods of ten minutes each way are played. If the score is still level the tie goes to a replay.

Covid-19 caused it too be London and New York final year part of the Connacht championship until 2022. Sligo were excluded too from 2020 championships but were back in 2021.

Qualifiers format
Twenty eight of the twenty nine teams beaten in the provincial championships enter the All-Ireland qualifiers, which are knock-out. Sixteen of the seventeen teams (New York do not enter the qualifiers) eliminated before their provincial semi-finals play eight matches in round 1 of the qualifiers, with the winners of these games playing the eight beaten provincial semi-finalists in round 2. The eight winning teams from round 2 play-off against each other in round 3, with the four winning teams playing the four beaten provincial finalists in round 4. This completes the double-elimination format as the four round 4 winners re-enter the main competition at the Super 8 stage (officially named The All-Ireland Quarter-Final Group Stage). Further details of the format are included with each qualifier round listed below.

In rounds one to three, teams from divisions three and four of the National Football League have home advantage if drawn against teams from divisions one and two.

All qualifier matches are knockout with "Winner On The Day" rules being applied if a match is level at the end of the normal seventy minutes. Initially two extra time periods of ten minutes each way are played. If the score is still level two further periods of five minutes each way are played. If the score is still level, the winner is determined by a penalty shoot-out.

All-Ireland format
Significant changes to the format of the All-Ireland championship were made at the GAA's Annual Congress in February 2017 and introduced in 2018. The major change was the creation of the All-Ireland Quarter-Final Group Stage commonly known as "The Super 8s", which replaced the four knockout quarter-finals. Two groups of four teams compete in three rounds (officially referred to as phases) in the Super 8s.

The top two teams in each group contest the semi-finals on a weekend in early August. The All-Ireland final is played "by the 35th Sunday of the year".

The semi-finals and final are knock-out. If the score is level at the end of the normal seventy minutes in a semi-final, two periods of ten minutes each way are played. If the score is still level the semi-final is replayed. If the score is level at the end of the normal seventy minutes in the final, the match is replayed.

The changes will be trialed for three years before being reviewed by the GAA in late 2020.

Live TV coverage
RTÉ, the national broadcaster in Ireland, will provide the majority of the live television coverage of the football championship in the second year of a five-year deal running from 2017 until 2021. Sky Sports will also broadcast live games and have exclusive rights to a number of matches including some All-Ireland football super 8 matches. Both RTÉ and Sky Sports televise the two All-Ireland semi-finals and final live.

, BBC Northern Ireland planned to air four Ulster Championship games live: the Antrim–Tyrone quarter-final, the two semi-finals, and the final.

Provincial championships

Connacht Senior Football Championship

For official fixtures and results see Connacht Senior Football Championship at gaa.ie

Leinster Senior Football Championship

The four teams who won their quarter-finals in the previous year are given byes to this year's quarter-finals. Six of the seven remaining teams play-off in the preliminary round with the seventh team also receiving a bye to the quarter-finals.

For official fixtures and results see Leinster Senior Football Championship at gaa.ie

Munster Senior Football Championship

The two teams who won the semi-finals in the previous year are given byes to this year's semi-finals.

For official fixtures and results see Munster Senior Football Championship at gaa.ie

Ulster Senior Football Championship

An un-seeded draw determined the fixtures for all nine teams. In April 2018, the Ulster GAA Competitions Control Committee introduced a rule that the two teams playing in the preliminary round would be exempt from playing in the preliminary round in the following two years. Derry and Tyrone were therefore awarded byes to the quarter-finals in 2020 and 2021.

For official fixtures and results see Ulster Senior Football Championship at gaa.ie

All-Ireland Series

Qualifiers
For official fixtures and results see All-Ireland Senior Football Championship at gaa.ie

Round 1
In the first round of the qualifiers sixteen of the seventeen teams beaten in the preliminary rounds or quarter-finals of the provincial championships competed. New York did not enter the qualifiers. The round 1 draw was unrestricted − if two teams played each other in a provincial match they could be drawn to meet again. The eight winners of these matches played the eight beaten provincial semi-finalists in round 2 of the qualifiers.

The following teams took part in round 1 –

 
  London
  Leitrim

 
  Offaly
  Wicklow
  Wexford
  Louth
  Carlow
  Westmeath
  Longford

 
  Tipperary
  Waterford

 
  Derry
  Monaghan
  Down
  Antrim
  Fermanagh

Round 2
In the second round of the qualifiers the eight winning teams from round 1 played the eight beaten provincial semi-finalists. The round 2 draw was unrestricted − if two teams played each other in a provincial match they could be drawn to meet again. The eight winners of these matches played each other in four matches in round 3.

The following teams took part in round 2 –

  Offaly
  Leitrim
  Antrim
  Derry
  Monaghan
  Down
  Longford
  Westmeath

 Connacht (2)
  Sligo
  Mayo

 Leinster (2)
  Kildare
  Laois

 Munster (2)
  Limerick
  Clare

 Ulster (2)
  Tyrone
  Armagh

Round 3
In the third round of the qualifiers the eight winning teams from round 2 played off in four matches. Round 3 draw rules did not allow two teams that have played each other in a provincial match to meet again if such a pairing could be avoided. In 2019 only Laois and Westmeath had played each other and this pairing was prevented in the draw. The four winners of these matches played the four beaten provincial finalists in round 4.

The following teams took part in round 3:

  Kildare
  Tyrone
  Laois
  Westmeath
  Clare
  Mayo
  Armagh
 Offaly

Round 4
In the fourth round of the qualifiers, the four winning teams from round 3 played the four beaten provincial finalists. Round 4 draw rules did not allow two teams that had played each other in a provincial match to meet again if such a pairing could be avoided. The matches were normally held in neutral venues (unless the two teams involved had an arrangement or agreed to a coin toss to decide who had home advantage). The four winners of these matches played in the round robin All-Ireland Super 8s.

The following teams took part in round 4 –

Draw

Group stage
For official fixtures and results see All-Ireland Senior Football Championship at gaa.ie

Structure
Format

The four provincial champions and the four winning teams from round four of the All-Ireland qualifiers are divided into two groups of four teams. Each group consists of two provincial champions and the two losing provincial finalists of the other two provinces or the team that beats them in round four of the qualifiers.

There are three rounds of two games in each group. Teams have one home game, one away game and one game in Croke Park:

Phase 1 – Weekend of 13/14 July – Each of the two provincial champions play one of the two qualifiers with both provincial champions having home advantage.

Phase 2 – Weekend of 20/21 July – The provincial champions play each other and the two qualifiers play each other. All round 2 matches are in Croke Park.

Phase 3 – Weekend of 3/4 August – Both qualifiers have home advantage when they play the provincial champions.

Dublin, if they qualify, will play their home game at Croke Park meaning that they will have two "Super 8" games in Croke Park. Some counties criticised the use of Croke Park as a home venue for Dublin. At the GAA Congress on 23 February 2019 Donegal proposed that Dublin be limited to playing one "Super 8" game at Croke Park. The motion failed as it only received 36% of the available votes.

Super 8 games are played in the four weeks beginning in early July and ending in the first weekend in August (which is also the bank holiday weekend in the Republic of Ireland). Two points are awarded for a win and one point for a draw. The top two teams in each group advance to the All-Ireland semi-finals.

Tie-breaker

If only two teams are level on group points –
 The team that won the head-to-head match is ranked first
 If this game was a draw, score difference (total scored minus total conceded in all group games) is used to rank the teams
 If score difference is identical, total scored is used to rank the teams
 If still identical, a play-off is required
If three or more teams are level on group points, score difference is used to rank the teams.

Group 1

Group 2

Knockout stage

Semi-finals
The winner of Super 8s Group 1 played the runner-up of Super 8s Group 2, while the winner of Super 8s Group 2 played the runner-up of Super 8s Group 1.

Final

The Central Competitions Control Committee of the GAA decided in October 2018 that, in future, the final should be played "by the 35th Sunday of the year". Traditionally the final was held on the third Sunday in September.

Championship statistics
All scores correct as of 13 August 2019

Top Scorer: overall

Top scorer: single game

Scoring events
Widest winning margin: 26
 Dublin 5–21 – 0–10 Louth (Leinster SFC)
Most goals in a match: 7
Cork 3-09 – 4-09 Roscommon (Super 8s)
Most points in a match: 40
Donegal 1–24 – 2–16 Cavan (Ulster SFC)
Kerry 1–20 – 1–20 Donegal (Super 8s)
Dublin 2–26 – 0–14 Roscommon (Super 8s)
Cavan 0–23 – 0–17 Armagh (Ulster SFC)
Most goals by one team in a match: 5
Dublin 5–18 – 1–17 Cork (Super 8s)
Dublin 5–21 – 0–10 Louth (Leinster SFC)
 Highest aggregate score: 53 points
Dublin 5–18 – 1–17 Cork (Super 8s)
Lowest aggregate score: 17 points
Clare 0-09 – 0-08 Waterford (Munster SFC)
Lowest score by one team in a match: 4 points
New York 0-04 – 1–22 Mayo (Connacht SFC)
Dublin 1–17 – 0-04 Meath (Leinster SFC Final)

Miscellaneous
Dublin became the first county to win a 9th provincial title in a row and 5 All-Ireland senior titles in a row.
 There were first time championship meetings for:
Westmeath vs Waterford 
Leitrim vs Clare 
Offaly vs Sligo
Cork vs Laois 
Meath vs Clare
Darren Mulhearne notably made his championship debut for Waterford against Clare in the 2019 Munster Senior Football Championship quarter-final at the age of 46, believed to be the oldest player to debut. Two of his opponents in that game, and fellow debutants, had a combined age that was less than that of Mulhearne. He kept a clean sheet, in a one-point loss. Mulhearne was called into the team after Aaron Beresford sustained an injury. Mulhearne had first been part of the Waterford senior team as a 17-year-old schoolboy, but never played.
Meath scored 0–4 in the Leinster final, the lowest score by a team in a provincial final since 1985, when Laois scored 0–4 against Dublin.
Meath reached the last eight for the first time since 2010
Dublin and their manager Jim Gavin extended their record-breaking unbeaten streak to 37 consecutive championship games, as of 14 September 2019. Gavin later stood down as Dublin manager.

Referees Panel
As announced in April 2019:
 Ciaran Branagan (Down)
 Barry Cassidy (Derry)
 Brendan Cawley (Kildare), first year
 David Coldrick (Meath)
 Niall Cullen (Fermanagh)
 Maurice Deegan (Laois)
 David Gough (Meath)
 Jerome Henry (Mayo)
 Sean Hurson (Tyrone)
 Fergal Kelly (Longford)
 Conor Lane (Cork)
 Martin McNally (Monaghan)
 Joe McQuillan (Cavan)
 James Molloy (Galway), first year
 Noel Mooney (Cavan)
 Paddy Neilan (Roscommon)
 Anthony Nolan (Wicklow)
 Derek O'Mahoney (Tipperary)

Stadia and locations

Awards
All Star Team of the Year

 Player has previously been selected.

County breakdown
 Dublin = 7
 Kerry = 4
 Tyrone = 2
 Mayo = 1
 Donegal = 1

List of nominees

References